João Afonso may refer to
João Afonso (sculptor)
João Afonso (singer) (1965, :pt:João Afonso) Mozambican born Portuguese singer
João Afonso (footballer, born 1982) Portuguese footballer for Belenenses
João Afonso (footballer, born 1990) Portuguese footballer for Córdoba CF
João Afonso Crispim (born 1995), Brazilian footballer for Gil Vicente